Sigara trilineata is a species of water boatman in the family Corixidae. It is found in North America.

References

Articles created by Qbugbot
Insects described in 1872
Sigara